Edward Scott Glacken (July 28, 1944 – December 27, 2006) was an American football quarterback and coach. He played college football at Duke University. In 1963, Glacken threw for a school-record 12 touchdown passes. Glacken finished his Duke career with 3,170 yards and 24 touchdowns, helping the Blue Devils to a 15–13–2 record during his final three years as a player.

Glacken played two seasons with the Denver Broncos, leading them to a 1967 exhibition victory over the Detroit Lions, the first time an American Football League club defeated a team from the rival National Football League.

Glacken would begin a two-decade long coaching career in 1970, taking the head coaching position at Georgetown University in Washington, D.C., helping to return the Hoyas to NCAA intercollegiate competition after a number of years as a club team.

Glacken retired as Georgetown's coach in 1992, having compiled a 98–94–2 record.

See also
 List of American Football League players

References

External links
 

1944 births
2006 deaths
American football quarterbacks
Denver Broncos (AFL) players
Duke Blue Devils football players
Georgetown Hoyas football coaches
Coaches of American football from Washington, D.C.
Players of American football from Washington, D.C.